The Jigsaw Jones Mysteries is an American series of young children's detective fiction written by New York author James Preller. The series is published by Scholastic Corporation. The first book was published in 1998; 32 regular mysteries appeared between 1998 and 2007 plus 6 Super Special mysteries between 2001 and 2008. A  33rd book in the regular series is to be published in August 2017.

Books in this series
 #1 The Case of Hermie the Missing Hamster 
 #2 The Case of the Christmas Snowman
 #3 The Case of the Secret Valentine
 #4 The Case of the Spooky Sleepover
 #5 The Case of the Stolen Baseball Cards
 #6 The Case of the Mummy Mystery
 #7 The Case of the Runaway Dog
 #8 The Case of the Great Sled Race
 #9 The Case of the Stinky Science Project
 #10 The Case of the Ghostwriter
 #11 The Case of the Marshmallow Monster
 #12 The Case of the Class Clown
 #13 The Case of the Detective in Disguise
 #14 The Case of the Bicycle Bandit
 #15 The Case of the Haunted Scarecrow
 #16 The Case of the Sneaker Sneak
 #17 The Case of the Disappearing Dinosaur
 #18 The Case of the Bear Scare
 #19 The Case of the Golden Key
 #20 The Case of the Race Against Time
 #21 The Case of the Rainy-Day Mystery
 #22 The Case of the Best Pet Ever
 #23 The Case of the Perfect Prank
 #24 The Case of the Glow-in-the-Dark Ghost
 #25 The Case of the Vanishing Painting
 #26 The Case of the Double-Trouble Detective
 #27 The Case of the Frog-Jumping Contest
 #28 The Case of the Food Fight
 #29 The Case of the Snowboarding Superstar
 #30 The Case of the Kidnapped Candy
 #31 The Case of the Spoiled Rotten Spy
 #32 The Case of the Groaning Ghost
 #33 The Case from Outer Space
 #34 The Case of the Smelly Sneaker
 #35 The Case of the Hat Burglar

Super Specials and Others
 Jigsaw Jones Super Special #1: The Case of the Buried Treasure
 Jigsaw Jones Super Special #2: The Case of the Million Dollar Mystery
 Jigsaw Jones Super Special #3: The Case of the Missing Falcon
 Jigsaw Jones Super Special #4: The Case of the Santa Claus Mystery
 Jigsaw Jones Super Special #5: The Case of the Four-Leaf Clover
 Jigsaw Jones Super Special #6: The Case of the Wild Turkey Chase
 Jigsaw Jones Detective Tips

Characters
 Theodore "Jigsaw" Jones is the main character of the series. He once claimed that he himself was the first detective in the whole second grade.
 Mila Yeh is the partner of Jigsaw and his best friend. She also might be his love interest.

Room 201
 Bigs Maloney is one of the class's nicest people and the toughest and the strongest in second grade.
 Miss Gleason, the class teacher
 Lucy Hiller, student in Jigsaw's class
 Bobby Solofsky, an enemy detective to Theodore.
 Jasper "Stringbean" Noonan, nicknamed because he is as thin as a stringbean.
 Timothy O'Brien, they called him Wingnut because his ears were three sizes too big.
 Ralphie Jordan, The Class's Clown and Prankster.

Others in Jigsaw's school
 Mr. Rogers, the principal
 Mr. Copabianco, the janitor

Jigsaw's Family
 Jigsaw's dad, who was a detective when he was in Grade 2, and studied in the same room (Room 201) as Jigsaw.
 Mom, came from Hackensack, New Jersey, is very strict about the words "hate" and "dumb".
 Billy, Daniel and Nick, older brothers of Jigsaw
 Hillary, Jigsaw's older sister
 Rags, Jigsaw's dog
 Grams

Others
 Mike and Mary, owner of Our Daily Bread and Brownies shop near the school, and family friends of the Jones.
 Marc (Red Cap), a teenager who lives near Our Bread and Pita, friend of Jigsaw, Mike and Mary.
 Reginard Armitage Pinkerton III, the richest kid of the town.
 Chase Jackson, the star of the TV show Spy Guy and Jigsaw's friend. Chase appeared in the book #31 The Case of the Spoiled Rotten Spy"

References

Notes
Also published in 2017 as The Case of the Smelly Sneaker''

External links
Author James Preller's website

Mystery novels by series
Series of children's books
American children's novels
Children's mystery novels